Adam Rusling (born 25 May 2003) is a professional rugby league footballer who plays as a  for Cornwall R.L.F.C. in the RFL League 1.

He has previously played for the Castleford Tigers in the Betfred Super League.

In 2021 he made his Super League début for Castleford against the Salford Red Devils.

In November 2021 it was announced that he had joined Hull Kingston Rovers, his hometown club, on a reserve contract for 2022.

References

External links
Castleford Tigers profile
Castleford Tigers: Who are Cain Robb, Caelum Jordan, Jack Sadler, Adam Rusling and Nathan Magee? Introducing FIVE teenagers making their debut against Salford Red Devils

2003 births
Living people
Castleford Tigers players
Cornwall RLFC players
English rugby league players
Hull Kingston Rovers players
Rugby league five-eighths